The national coat of arms of Equatorial Guinea was adopted on 21 August 1979.

This coat of arms shows a grey shield, which contains a silk cotton tree. This represents the location where the first treaty was signed between Portugal and the local ruler. Over the shield, there is 6 six-pointed stars, representing the mainland and the five main islands.

Motto
Underneath the shield is the national motto of Equatorial Guinea, Unidad, Paz, Justicia ("Unity, Peace, Justice"). The motto was adopted in 1968. During the dictatorship of Francisco Nguema (1972–79) the arms and motto were changed, a combination of different tools and swords with a cock overall, and motto on two stripes, in the middle of the arms Trabajo (work), and below Unidad, Paz, Justicia, but the original 1968 coat of arms' motto was restored afterward.

Historical coats of arms

See also
 Flag of Equatorial Guinea

References

National symbols of Equatorial Guinea
Equatorial Guinea